Earthandsky (stylized in all caps; read as Earth and Sky, sometimes referred as Earth & Sky) is the sixth studio album by American rock band Of Mice & Men. It was released on September 27, 2019, through Rise Records. The album was produced by Josh Wilbur and is the follow-up to the group's fifth album, Defy (2018). It is their last album to be released on this label before the band signed to SharpTone Records in 2021. It sold 4,000 copies in the US in its first week.

Background and promotion
On October 10, 2018, Aaron Pauley announced that the band is working on a new album with producer Josh Wilbur. Pauley has also stated that the new record will be 'heavier' compared to Defy.

On February 14, 2019, the band released the first single of the album titled "How to Survive" which, as they stated, sounded much heavier than tracks from their previous album Defy.

On May 3, the band released the second single titled "Mushroom Cloud" and its corresponding music video.

On July 26, the band released the third single and title track "Earth & Sky" along with a music video.

On September 5, the band released the fourth single of the album titled "Taste of Regret" along with an accompanying music video.

Critical reception

The album received mostly positive reviews from critics. AllMusic gave the album positive review and saying: "Earthandsky feels even more locked-in; an expertly crafted and undeniably hefty slab of grade-A melodic hardcore that plays fast and loose with genre tropes without losing any vitality in the process." Alternative Press gave the album a positive review and stated: "Of Mice & Men brought so much authenticity to Earthandsky by continuing to explore the realities of the mind. No two songs are the same. There's aggression, there's darkness and there's exploration of emotions. Then you get smacked with sonic heaviness, which fans can totally embrace and welcome to the OM&M repertoire."

Dead Press! gave the album a positive review saying: "With a determined mindset, Of Mice & Men may have proved on Defy that they can continue as a quartet, but with Earthandsky, the group display the ability to lead the next wave of metalcore." Distorted Sound stated that "Earthandsky is a hefty gift from Of Mice & Men. One could argue it's merely the "step-up" from Defy with an expected push into an even heavier direction, but pockets of surprises with songs that don't hold back in the experimental changes give them a unique, refreshing sound."

Kerrang! was a little less positive stating, "Whichever facet of Of Mice & Men first appealed to fans, they're catered for even more ably on Earthandsky than on its predecessor. It is an album as epic as its title, and proves that, although this is a band who have had to traverse more trouble than some, they will not be defeated by them." Rock 'N' Load praised the album saying, "Earthandsky feels like a natural progression for Of Mice & Men, showing just how far they've come as musicians in the last 9 years while keeping true to the sound that made them a massive part of a lot of younger metal fans lives too."

Simon Crampton of Rock Sins rated the album 8 out of 10 and said: "6 albums into their career and Of Mice & Men have only just begun scratching the surface of what they are capable of. Earthandsky is one of the strongest albums in their entire arsenal and proves that no matter what is thrown at them, they are fully prepared to dust themselves off and keep coming back better than they were before." Wall of Sound gave the album a positive review saying: "Earthandsky is a representation of past and present day Of Mice & Men. The band aims to find the perfect balance in melodic metalcore right throughout this record, layering screams, vocals and breakdowns in a way that makes for an enjoyable listen."

Track listing

Personnel
Credits retrieved from AllMusic.

Of Mice & Men
 Aaron Pauley – lead vocals, bass
 Alan Ashby – rhythm guitar, backing vocals
 Phil Manansala – lead guitar, backing vocals
 Valentino Arteaga – drums, percussion

Additional personnel
 Josh Wilbur – engineering, mixing, production
 Nick Rowe – engineering
 Josh Brooks and Lana Migliore – assisting engineering
 Ted Jensen – mastering
 Mike Cortada – artwork, layout

Charts

References

2019 albums
Of Mice & Men (band) albums
Rise Records albums